Sweet and Lowdown is a 1999 American comedy-drama mockumentary  written and directed by Woody Allen. Loosely based on Federico Fellini's film La Strada, the film tells the story of confident jazz guitarist Emmet Ray (played by Sean Penn) who falls in love with mute laundress Hattie (Samantha Morton). Like several of Allen's other films (e.g., Zelig), the film is occasionally interrupted by interviews with critics and biographers like Allen, Nat Hentoff, Daniel Okrent, and Douglas McGrath, who comment on the film's plot as if the characters were real-life people.

The film received generally positive reviews upon release, with Penn and Morton receiving Oscar nominations for Best Actor and Best Supporting Actress, respectively.

Plot summary
Emmet Ray is a jazz guitarist who achieved some acclaim in the 1930s with a handful of recordings for RCA Victor, but faded from public view under mysterious circumstances. Although he is a talented musician, Ray's personal life fell into shambles after his disappearance from public view. He's often late or even absent for performances with his quintet due to heavy drinking. He spends extravagantly, and is a womanizer and a pimp. When he's not playing music or pursuing women, he shoots rats at garbage dumps and watches passing trains. 

Ray idolizes famed guitarist Django Reinhardt, so much so that he's said to have fled a nightclub performance with severe stage fright upon hearing a false rumor that Reinhardt was in the audience.

On a double date with his drummer, Ray meets Hattie, a shy, mute laundress. After overcoming initial frustration due to communication difficulties, Ray and Hattie form an affectionate and close relationship. However, Ray is convinced that a musician of his stature should never settle down with one woman. Because of this, Ray marries socialite Blanche Williams. But Williams sees Ray as a colorful example of lower-class life and a source of inspiration for her literary writing. During their marriage, Ray is tormented by nightmares and shouts out Hattie's name in his sleep.

When Williams cheats on Ray with mobster Al Torrio, Ray leaves her and finds Hattie. He assumes that she will take him back, but discovers that she is happily married and raising a family. Ray is despondent, and laments that leaving Hattie was a mistake. Woody Allen and the rest of the documentary experts remark that Ray's final compositions were legendary, reaching the quality of Reinhardt's.

Cast

Production

Development 

After his 1969 directing debut Take the Money and Run, Allen signed a contract to direct a series of films with United Artists. Told to "write what you want to write," Allen, a clarinetist and avid jazz enthusiast, wrote The Jazz Baby, a drama screenplay about a jazz musician set in the 1930s. Allen said later that the United Artists executives were "stunned ... because they had expected a comedy. [They] were very worried and told me, 'We realize that we signed a contract with you and you can do anything you want. But we want to tell you that we really don't like this.'" Allen went along with United Artists, writing and directing Bananas instead. In 1995, he dismissed The Jazz Baby as having been "probably too ambitious."

In 1998, Allen returned to the project, rewriting the script and changing its name to Sweet and Lowdown. Allen had originally planned to play Ray himself, but the director cast Sean Penn.  Allen also considered Johnny Depp, but the actor was busy at the time. Penn had a reputation for being difficult to work with, but Allen later said, "I had no problem with him whatsoever ... He gave it his all and took direction and made contributions himself ... a tremendous actor."

Allen, in a retrospective, said that he told Samantha Morton to "play [her] part like Harpo Marx. And she said, 'Who is Harpo Marx?' and I realized how young she was. Then I told her about him [and] she went back and saw the films."

Filming 

Sweet and Lowdown was filmed entirely in New York and New Jersey but is set in the Chicago area and California. 

The film was the first of Allen's that was edited by Alisa Lepselter, who has edited all of Allen's films since. Lepselter succeeded Susan E. Morse, who edited Allen's films for the previous twenty years.

It was also the first of three films where Allen collaborated with Chinese cinematographer Zhao Fei.  Allen had first noticed Zhao with his award-winning work on Raise the Red Lantern, some years earlier.

Music
The music for the film was arranged and conducted by Dick Hyman. All of the guitar solos are played by guitarist Howard Alden.

Additional rhythm guitarists were Bucky Pizzarelli and James Chirillo. Chirillo played rhythm guitar on the track Sweet Georgia Brown. Pizzarelli created all other rhythm tracks.

Soundtrack

When Day Is Done (1926)- Written by Robert Katscher – Performed by Django Reinhardt
Clarinet Marmalade (1918) – Written by Larry Shields and Henry Ragas – Performed by Ted Lewis and His Orchestra
Parlez-moi d'Amour (1930) – Written by Jean Lenoir – Performed by Howard Alden
Mystery Pacific (1936–7) – Written by Django Reinhardt and Stéphane Grappelli – Performed by Howard Alden, Bucky Pizzarelli and [Kelly Friesen 
Limehouse Blues (1922) – Lyrics by Philip Braham – Written by Douglas Furber – Arranged by Dick Hyman
It Don't Mean a Thing (1931) – Lyrics by Irving Mills – Written by Duke Ellington
Out of Nowhere (1931) – Lyrics by Edward Heyman – Written by Johnny Green
I'll See You in My Dreams (1924) – Lyrics by Gus Kahn – Written by Isham Jones
Sweet Georgia Brown (1925) – Music by Ben Bernie and Maceo Pinkard – Lyrics by Kenneth Casey
Unfaithful Woman (1999) – Written by Dick Hyman
Shine (1910) – Lyrics by Cecil Mack, Lew Brown – Music by Ford Dabney
After You've Gone (1918) – Lyrics by Henry Creamer – Written by Turner Layton
I'm Forever Blowing Bubbles (1919) – Lyrics by James Brockman, Nat Vincent, James Kendis – Music by John W. Kellette
There'll Be Some Changes Made (1921) – Lyrics by Billy Higgins – Music by W. Benton Overstreet
Viper Mad (1937) – Written by Clarence Williams (musician) and Sidney Bechet – Performed by Sidney Bechet
Indiana (1917) – Written by Ballard MacDonald and James F. Hanley – Performed by Red Nichols
Aloha Oe (1908) – Written by Queen Liliuokalani – Performed by Dick Monday
Abide with Me (1847) – Lyrics by Henry F. Lyte – Music by William H. Monk
12th Street Rag (1919) – Written by Euday L. Bowman – Performed by Howard Alden
The Peanut Vendor (1927) – Written by Moïse Simons – English Lyrics by L. Wolfe Gilbert and Marion Sunshine
All of Me (1931) – Written by Gerald Marks and Seymour Simons 
Caravan (1936) – Written by Duke Ellington, Juan Tizol and Irving Mills – Performed by Bunny Berigan and His Orchestra 
Old Fashioned Love (1923) – Music by James P. Johnson – Lyrics by Cecil Mack
Just A Gigolo (1929) – Written by Irving Caesar – Written by Leonello Casucci and Julius Brammer
Nevertheless  (I'm in Love with You) (1931) – Lyrics by Bert Kalmar – Music by Harry Ruby
3:00 AM Blues (1999) – Written by Dick Hyman
Liebestraum No. 3 (1850) – Written by Franz Liszt – Performed by Django Reinhardt
Since My Best Gal Turned Me Down (1927) – Written by Ray Ludwig and Howdy Quicksell – Performed by Bix Beiderbecke
Wrap Your Troubles in Dreams (1931) – Lyrics by Ted Koehler, Billy Moll – Music by Harry Barris
Hot Lips (1922) – Written by Henry Busse, Henry Lange and Lou Davis – Performed by Henry Busse and His Orchestra
You Were Meant for Me (1929) – Lyrics by Arthur Freed – Music by Nacio Herb Brown
Avalon (1920) – Written by Buddy G. DeSylva, Al Jolson and Vincent Rose – Performed by Django Reinhardt
Lulu's Back in Town (1935) – Music by Harry Warren – Lyrics by Al Dubin
Sweet Sue, Just You (1928) – Lyrics by Will J. Harris – Music by Victor Young – Performed by Howard Alden

Reception
Sweet and Lowdown received generally positive reviews from critics. It currently holds a 77% 'fresh' rating on Rotten Tomatoes from 61 reviews, with the consensus: "Critics praise Woody Allen's Sweet and Lowdown for its charming, light-hearted comedy and quality acting." The film carries a 70 on Metacritic indicating generally favorable reviews.

Morton's performance was met with critical acclaim, with Salon critic Stephanie Zacharek saying that she "quietly explodes [the film] ... Her performance is like nothing I've seen in recent years."

Awards and nominations 
Sweet and Lowdown was nominated for the Academy Awards for Best Actor in a Leading Role (Penn) and Best Actress in a Supporting Role (Morton). The pair were also nominated for Golden Globe Awards in the acting categories for Motion Picture - Comedy or Musical. The film received three nominations from the Chlotrudis Society for Independent Films for Best Actor, Best Supporting Actress, and Best Screenplay.

In addition, Morton was nominated for Best Supporting Actress in the Chicago Film Critics Association Awards, the Los Angeles Film Critics Association Awards, the National Society of Film Critics Awards, and for an Empire Award for Best British Actress. At the London Film Critics Circle Awards, Morton won British Supporting Actress of the Year.

References

Bibliography

External links

 
 
 
 
 

1999 films
1999 comedy-drama films
1999 independent films
1990s American films
1990s English-language films
American comedy-drama films
American mockumentary films
Fictional mute characters
Films about guitars and guitarists
Films directed by Woody Allen
Films produced by Jean Doumanian
Films set in the 1920s
Films set in the 1930s
Films shot in New Jersey
Films shot in New York (state)
Films with screenplays by Woody Allen
Jazz films
Sony Pictures Classics films